Wilfred Cyril Izzard (25 February 1892 – 15 September 1977) was an English cricketer.  Izzard was a right-handed batsman.  He was born at Northampton, Northamptonshire.

Izzard made his first-class debut for Northamptonshire against Lancashire in the 1919 County Championship.  He made eleven further first-class appearances, the last of which came against Lancashire in the 1920 County Championship.  In his twelve first-class matches, he scored 206 runs at an average of 10.30, with a high score of 51.  This score was his only first-class fifty and came against Derbyshire in 1919.

He died at the town of his birth on 15 September 1977.

References

External links
Wilfred Izzard at ESPNcricinfo
Wilfred Izzard at CricketArchive

1892 births
1977 deaths
Cricketers from Northampton
English cricketers
Northamptonshire cricketers